Not A Single Doubt (1 October 2001 –  27 June 2022) was an Australian thoroughbred racehorse and successful stallion, having sired over 70 individual stakes winners.

Background
A first-crop son and the first stakes winner of champion sire Redoute's Choice, Not A Single Doubt was homebred at Arrowfield Stud and is by the mare, Singles Bar, a daughter of Rory's Jester.

Racing career

2003/04: two-year-old season

Originally trained by Graeme Rogerson at Randwick Racecourse, Not A Single Doubt won his first three starts by a combined 9 lengths including the Canonbury Stakes and the inaugural Strawberry Hill Slipper Stakes at Wyong where he set a new course record time.  On the strength of these performances, Not A Single Doubt started a short priced favourite for the 2YO Magic Millions Classic however ran second behind that seasons Australian Champion Two Year Old, Dance Hero.  
Not A Single Doubt's campaign was cut short after the Todman Stakes due to a soft tissue injury in his off-fore leg and he would not race again for another ten months.

2004/05: three-year old season

Not A Single Doubt was transferred to Melbourne trainer Tony Vasil.  Majority owner John Messara explained,  “We would like to make a stallion out of Not A Single Doubt,  he is a speed horse, we believe Victoria offers an excellent suite of sprint races in the autumn."

Not A Single Doubt only had one more victory before being retired to stud when successful in the Zeditave Stakes when ridden by Kerrin McEvoy.

Stud career

Not A Single Doubt commenced stud duties at Arrowfield Stud in 2005 for a service fee of A$13,750.

In 2020 it was announced by John Messara that Not A Single Doubt had been retired from active stud duty due to pulmonary disease.  At the time of his retirement his service fee had increased to a career high A$110,000.   Messara stated, "Not A Single Doubt is a wonderful story for Arrowfield and for many breeders, owners, buyers and trainers, rising from the bottom of our roster to become one of Australia’s most popular and successful stallions. We are immensely grateful to him, and he will be loved and cared for at Arrowfield for the rest of his life."

Death
Not A Single Doubt was euthanised on June 27, 2022 due to a progressive lung disease.

Notable progeny

Not A Single Doubt has sired 15 individual Group 1 winners:

c = colt, f = filly, g = gelding

Pedigree

References 

Australian racehorses
Racehorses bred in Australia
Racehorses trained in Australia
2001 racehorse births
2022 racehorse deaths
Thoroughbred family 20-a